The Scottish National League (currently named Tennents National League One for sponsorship reasons) is an amateur league competition for rugby union clubs in Scotland. It forms the 2nd tier of the Scottish League Championship.

The league winner is automatically promoted to the top tier of Scottish league rugby (The Tennents Premiership). The bottom two clubs are relegated into National League Two, replaced by the top two teams in that league.

Scottish National League One, 2019–20

Demoted from Premiership: Ayr RFC, Boroughmuir RFC, Heriot's RFC, Melrose RFC, Stirling County RFC and Watsonians RFC
Promoted from National League Two: Biggar RFC and Highland RFC.

With the creation of the SRU's semi-professional Super 6 there was a major reshuffling of the top leagues. The six franchise holding clubs saw their "Club XV's" relegated from the Premiership, replaced by the six top teams from the 2018-19 National League One.

Play was suspended on 14 March due to the COVID-19 pandemic in the United Kingdom. Furthermore, the season was officially cancelled without any winner or relegation/promotion on 31 March, despite Biggar already crowned league champions.